The Literary and Scientific Institute was located in Huntingdon, Cambridgeshire, England. Founded by Robert Fox, it is currently used as Commemoration Hall.

References

Buildings and structures in Huntingdonshire
Huntingdon